North Somerset unitary council is elected every four years, with fifty councillors to be elected. Since the first election to the unitary authority in 1995, the council has either been under Conservative party control, or no party has held a majority. The Conservatives gained a majority at the 2007 election and have retained control since then. At the 2015 election, the outcome was as follows:

Ward results

An asterisk * indicates an incumbent seeking re-election.

Backwell

In the 2011 election Karen Barclay won the seat as an Independent but switched to Conservative

Banwell & Winscombe

Blagdon & Churchill

Clevedon East

Clevedon South

Clevedon Walton

Clevedon West

Clevedon Yeo

Congresbury

Gordano Valley

Hutton and Locking

Long Ashton

Nailsea Golden Valley

Nailsea West End

Nailsea Yeo

Nailsea Youngwood

Pill

Portishead East

At the previous election Arthur Terry won the old single member ward of Portishead East for the Conservatives but stood as an Independent in 2015.  David Pashley was the sitting councillor for the old Portishead Coastal ward.

Portishead North

Portishead South

Portishead West

Weston-super-Mare Bournville

Weston-Super-Mare Central

Robert Payne was elected as a councillor for the old Weston-Super-Mare West at the 2011 election.

Weston-Super-Mare Hillside

Weston-Super-Mare Kewstoke

Weston-Super-Mare Mid Worle

Weston-Super-Mare Milton

Weston-Super-Mare North Worle

Weston-Super-Mare South Worle

Weston-super-Mare Uphill

Weston-Super-Mare Winterstoke

Wick St Lawrence and St Georges

Winford

Wrington

Annabel Tall had been elected as a Conservative councillor for the Yatton ward in the 2011 election.

Yatton

References

2015 English local elections
May 2015 events in the United Kingdom
2015
2010s in Somerset